Robert Charles Post (born October 17, 1947) is an American legal scholar who is currently a professor of law at Yale Law School where he served as the Dean of Yale Law School from 2009 to 2017.

Biography
Post received his Bachelor of Arts from Harvard University in 1969 and earned his Juris Doctor from Yale Law School in 1977. While at Yale, he served as an editor of the Yale Law Journal. He then clerked for D.C. Circuit Judge David L. Bazelon and Supreme Court Justice William J. Brennan, Jr. Post subsequently earned a Ph.D. in History of American Civilization from Harvard University, worked briefly in private practice, and started his career in law teaching at Berkeley Law in 1983. Post moved from Berkeley to Yale in 2003 and succeeded Harold Koh as Dean when Koh was appointed to serve as Legal Adviser to the U.S. State Department. Post has been quoted in the New York Times on the composition of the Supreme Court. He was elected to the American Philosophical Society in 2011. 

Post's academic interests include constitutional law, First Amendment, legal history, and affirmative action. His Citizens Divided (2014) looks at the constitutional aspects of electoral finance.

See also 
 List of law clerks of the Supreme Court of the United States (Seat 3)

References

External links
 Robert Post on Yale Law School's website

American lawyers
American legal scholars
American legal writers
Jewish American attorneys
Harvard University alumni
Law clerks of the Supreme Court of the United States
Deans of Yale Law School
Yale Law School alumni
Yale Law School faculty
First Amendment scholars
Legal historians
American scholars of constitutional law
1947 births
Living people
Yale Sterling Professors
Members of the American Philosophical Society